Nabala was an ancient Roman–Berber diocese in the province of Mauretania Caesariensis, located in present-day Algeria. No ancient bishops are known from the diocese, although it was vacant in 484; similarly, the seat of the bishopric remains unknown. Today, Nabala survives as a suppressed and titular bishopric of the Roman Catholic Church. The current holder of the see is Lucilo B. Quiambao, a former bishop of Legazpi.

References

Archaeological sites in Algeria
Catholic titular sees in Africa
Former Roman Catholic dioceses in Africa
Roman towns and cities in Mauretania Caesariensis
Ancient Berber cities